The Boxcar Fire was a wildfire one mile southeast of Maupin, Oregon in the United States. The fire started on June 21, 2018 due to a lightning strike and subsequently burned  due to dry, windy conditions in Central Oregon. The fire was one of 70 wildfires started in Oregon due to lightning strikes over a two-day period. The Boxcar Fire was the largest out of three major fires burning in the region, which included the Jack Knife Fire and South Junction Fire. The fire was contained in late June.

Events

The Boxcar Fire was started by a lightning strike around 7:45 a.m. on June 21, 2018, one mile southeast of Maupin, Oregon during a heavy bout of lightning strikes that impacted Central Oregon of the course of two days, which caused almost 70 wildfires. 

Fueled by grass and brush, the fire has spread south and east due to gusty winds. Of the areas burned,  were private land. Sections of U.S. Route 197 were closed due to efforts by fire crews to contain the blaze. Bakeoven Road was closed for burnout operations.

The fire merged into the South Junction Fire on June 24 and was at 47 percent containment.

As of June 27, the fire had burned  and was contained days later.

Impact

The Boxcar Fire impacted the community of Maupin and nearby traffic, causing areas of Highway 197 to be closed.

Tourism

Harpham Flat Campground was burned by the fire, as well as the accompanying day use area, even though it was reopened to the public with no structural damage. Access areas to the Deschutes River were closed due to the fire, yet the river itself remained open for boating and recreation. Camping was discouraged by authorities in areas between Trout Creek and Maupin, impacting four campgrounds. Fourteen miles of camping areas along the John Day River were closed.

References

External links

 

2018 Oregon wildfires
June 2018 events in the United States
Wasco County, Oregon